Aelin Peterson (born June 7, 1974) is an American cross-country skier. She competed in four events at the 2002 Winter Olympics in Salt Lake City, Utah.

Biography
Peterson spent her early life in Unalakleet and Fairbanks in Alaska. She was the cross-country skiing champion at Alaska High School in 1991 and 1992. She attended Northern Michigan University before competing in the Junior Nationals, winning five gold and four silver medals between 1992 and 1998. During this time, the U.S. Ski Association ranked her as the best junior skier in the country on two separate occasions.

In 1996, Peterson worked for Strong Capital Management in Menomonee Falls, Wisconsin. In 2000, she left her job to return to skiing. Before making the US team for the 2002 Winter Olympics, Peterson worked in Milwaukee, Wisconsin as a stock trader. She quit her job in finance to focus on her qualification for the Olympics. Prior to the Olympics, Peterson was forced to stop skiing for five years after contracting meningitis. She was inducted into the Alaska High School's Hall of Fame in 2006.

In December 2019, Peterson was diagnosed with breast cancer.

Cross-country skiing results
All results are sourced from the International Ski Federation (FIS).

Olympic Games

World Championships

World Cup

Season standings

References

External links
 

1974 births
Living people
American female cross-country skiers
Olympic cross-country skiers of the United States
Cross-country skiers at the 2002 Winter Olympics
21st-century American women